Bob Kulp (March 21, 1966) is an American businessman and politician.  A Republican, he was a member of the Wisconsin State Assembly from 2013 to 2021.

Early life and career
Kulp was born in Elkhart, Indiana, but moved with his family to Marathon County, Wisconsin, where he was raised on a dairy farm.  In 1985, Kulp founded Kulp's of Stratford, a roofing, insulation, and sheet metal installation contractor.  He subsequently created Marathon Metals in 2001 and Kulp Energy Solutions in 2011, which function as suppliers for his primary business. He also created Kulp Real Properties in 2001, through which he manages a real estate portfolio.  In 2014, he resumed his education through the online Thomas Edison State University, where he received his bachelor's degree in public administration in 2017.

Political career
In 2013, incumbent state representative Scott Suder announced he would resign from the Wisconsin State Assembly before the end of the year to accept a new job.  A special election was called to fill the pending vacancy, and Kulp was one of four Republicans who filed to run in the primary.  Kulp ultimately prevailed in the Republican primary with 43% of the vote, and went on to defeat Democrat Kenneth Slezak in the November 19 special election.  Kulp was sworn in as representative of the 69th district on December 4, 2013.

In 2018, the Wisconsin Ethics Commission issued a warning to Kulp for violated state ethics laws by promoting his company utilizing state resources.

In January 2020, Kulp announced that he would not seek a fifth term in the Wisconsin State Assembly.  He left office in January 2021.

Electoral history

Wisconsin Assembly (2013)

| colspan="6" style="text-align:center;background-color: #e9e9e9;"| Republican Primary, October 22, 2013

| colspan="6" style="text-align:center;background-color: #e9e9e9;"| Special Election, November 19, 2013

References

External links
 
 
 Official website (Archived 11/14/2020)
 Campaign website (Archived 11/3/2018))
 Kulp's of Stratford, LLC

 

1966 births
Living people
People from Elkhart, Indiana
People from Stratford, Wisconsin
Thomas Edison State University alumni
Businesspeople from Wisconsin
Republican Party members of the Wisconsin State Assembly